Robert Phillips Dearden Monypenny (9 May 1836 — 4 May 1890) was an English first-class cricketer and barrister.

The son of Robert Monypenny, he was born in May 1836 at Rolvenden, Kent. He studied at Trinity College at the University of Oxford. Monypenny played first-class cricket for the Marylebone Cricket Club on two occasions, against Oxford University at Oxford in 1861 and Sussex at Lord's in 1862. He scored 17 runs in these two matches, with a highest score of 8. A student of Lincoln's Inn, he was called to the bar in June 1864. He died at St Leonards-on-Sea in May 1890.

References

External links

1836 births
1890 deaths
People from Rolvenden
Alumni of Trinity College, Oxford
English cricketers
Marylebone Cricket Club cricketers
Members of Lincoln's Inn
English barristers